Intenso (Intense) is the thirteenth studio album recorded by Puerto Rican salsa singer Gilberto Santa Rosa released on March 6, 2001. The album became his third number-one set on the Billboard Tropical Albums chart. The album received a Latin Grammy nomination for Best Salsa Album and the single "Pueden decir" received a Latin Grammy nomination for Best Tropical Song.

Track listing
This information adapted from Allmusic.

Chart performance

Certification

See also
List of number-one Billboard Tropical Albums from the 2000s

References

2001 albums
Gilberto Santa Rosa albums
Sony Discos albums